Mikhail Dmitrievich Levashov (c. 1738–1774-76) was a Russian explorer and Lieutenant of the Imperial Russian Navy. After Vitus Bering's 1741 tragic venture he was, together with Peter Kuzmich Krenitzin, among the first to conduct an expedition to Alaska and the Aleutians.

Life 
Levashev was sent by Russian Empress Catherine II, as main assistant of expedition leader Krenitzin, to explore the northern parts of the Pacific Ocean and particularly the area around the Bering strait on four ships. Levashev was the commander of ship St. Paul, while Krenitzin was in command of the St. Catherine. Krenitzin and Levashev surveyed the eastern part of the Aleutian island chain. In 1768-69 Levashef wintered in a natural harbor in Unalaska. The following year, after resuming their explorations, both ships wintered in Kamchatka.

Certain geographic features of the Alaskan coast, like Avatanak and Akutan Island were named by Krenitzin and Levashev in the maps that were subsequently published.

On 4 July 1770, when Krenitzin drowned, Levashef assumed command of the Russian expedition fleet and returned to St. Petersburg, where he arrived on 22 October 1771.

Port Levashef, the harbor in Unalaska where Levashev had wintered his first year in the Northern Pacific was named in honor of this early Russian explorer by Lieutenant Gavril Sarychev.

References

External links 
The Naming of Alaska
Old map of Alaska showing Krenitzin and Levashev"s route
Russian Explorers

Bering Sea
Imperial Russian Navy personnel
Explorers from the Russian Empire
Explorers of Asia
Year of birth unknown
Year of death unknown
Russian explorers of North America
Explorers of Alaska
1730s births
1770s deaths
18th-century people from the Russian Empire